The Motuti River is a short, wide river in the Northland Region of New Zealand's North Island.

See also
List of rivers of New Zealand

References

Hokianga
Rivers of the Northland Region
Rivers of New Zealand